Carmine Giordano (c. 1685 in Cerreto Sannita – 1758 in Naples) was an Italian composer and organist. He studied at the Conservatorio napoletano della Pietà dei Turchini with Gennaro Ursino (1650–1715) and Nicola Fago.

It was long mistakenly thought that Carmine Giordano was father of Tommaso Giordano, who died in Dublin, and Giuseppe Giordano (1743–1798), called "Giordanello," but this turns out not to be the case; their father was Giuseppe Giordano, an opera buffa singer.

Bibliography
Enrica Donisi, Istituti, bande e società. Studi sulla musica a Benevento tra il 1561 e il 1961, Edizioni Realtà Sannita, Benevento, 2012, pp. 122-124.

References

1680s births

1758 deaths
Year of birth uncertain
18th-century Italian composers
Italian organists
Male organists